Club Social Deportivo Cultural Unión Santo Domingo (better Know Los Purtus) is a Peruvian football club, playing in the city of Chachapoyas, Amazonas, Peru.

History
The Club Cultural Union Santo Domingo was founded on February 10, 1979.

In 2007 Copa Perú, the club classified to the Regional Stage, but was eliminated by Sporting Pizarro in the Group Stage.

In 2009 Copa Perú, the club classified to the Regional Stage, but was eliminated by Defensor San José in the Group Stage.

In 2010 Copa Perú, the club classified to the National Stage,but was eliminated by Defensor San José in the Group Stage.

In 2016 Copa Perú, the club classified to the National Stage, but was eliminated by San José de Agua Blanca in the Repechage.

In 2017 Copa Perú, the club classified to the National Stage, but was eliminated when finished in 32nd place.

Honours

Regional
Liga Departamental de Amazonas:
Winners (3): 2007, 2016, 2017
Runner-up (3): 2009, 2010, 2022

Liga Provincial de Chachapoyas:
Winners (3): 2011, 2014, 2017
Runner-up (2): 2016, 2022

Liga Distrital de Chachapoyas:
Winners (4): 2010, 2011, 2016, 2022
Runner-up (3): 2009, 2014, 2017

See also
List of football clubs in Peru
Peruvian football league system

References

External links
 
 Libro del Unión Santo Domingo

Football clubs in Peru
Association football clubs established in 1979
1979 establishments in Peru